Malargüe is a city in the southwest part of province of Mendoza, Argentina, about 370 km south of the provincial capital Mendoza.

Overview
The city is located in a semi-arid area. Agriculture is focused on the production of seed potato, along with minor crops such as alfalfa, onion and garlic. In the past, the local industries included oil exploration and production (now almost completely deactivated) and uranium mining. As a touristic area, Malargüe provides hotels and cabins for visitors interested in eco-tourism in the summer and skiing in the winter at the nearby resorts of Las Leñas and Los Molles.

It hosts the annual National Festival of the Goat and the Provincial Festival of the Lamb, during the second week of January.

History

1972
On 13 October 1972 the Uruguayan Air Force Flight 571 crashed in the Andes, in the municipal territory of Malargüe.

Climate 
Malargüe's climate is dry and relatively cold. It is a semi-arid climate under the Köppen climate classification. Summers bring very warm days (the average high is ) and cool nights, with sporadic thunderstorms occurring.

Transport and infrastructures

Transportation 
Malargüe is linked to the north of Mendoza by National Route 40. This route continues south, entering Neuquén Province, but is only partially built and not well maintained beyond Malargüe City.

Air traffic in the area (only local flights) is served by the Comodoro D. Ricardo Salomón Airport. Aerolíneas Argentinas and American Jet offer services, as of 2021, to this airport.

Astronomic and space center 
Malargüe is also home to the Pierre Auger Observatory, an international physics experiment searching for ultra-high-energy cosmic rays.

The European Space Agency began construction of a deep space ground station 30 km south of Malargüe in 2010. It became operational in early 2013 Malargüe Station and is the third 35m dish in its ESTRACK network.

References

External links

 
 Municipality of Malargüe — Official website.
 Pierre Auger Observatory.

Populated places in Mendoza Province
Uranium mines
Mining in Argentina
Cities in Argentina
Argentina